The 1906 Haverford football team was an American football team that represented Haverford College as an independent during the 1906 college football season. The team compiled a 7–0–2 record and outscored opponents by a total of 138 to 33. Norman Thorn was the head coach. He had been the captain of the 1903 Haverford team.

Schedule

References

Haverford
Haverford Fords football seasons
College football undefeated seasons
Haverford football